The fourth season of Ang Probinsyano, a Philippine action drama television series, premiered on ABS-CBN's Primetime Bida evening block and worldwide on The Filipino Channel. The season ran from  November 8, 2017, to March 14, 2018, airing a total of 91 episodes. The series stars Coco Martin as SPO2 Ricardo Dalisay, together with an ensemble cast consisting of Susan Roces, Jaime Fabregas, Angel Aquino, John Arcilla, Jhong Hilario, John Prats, Sid Lucero, Mitch Valdes, Yassi Pressman, Eddie Garcia, and Lito Lapid. 

The fourth season of Ang Probinsyano deals with the looming mid-year elections in the Philippines, where Senator Mateo F. De Silva and Director Renato Hipolito are both jockeying for the top spot at the polls in order to secure the Senate Presidency and parlay such victory into a career as the President of the Philippines. Both De Silva and Hipolito relentlessly hunt down Cardo and the remnants of Pulang Araw in order to appeal to the voters. De Silva funds his campaign with the aid of his new-found ally, Don Emilio Syquia, through their drug-trading business. With the remaining members of Pulang Araw and his allies in prison, Cardo forms the vigilante and revolutionary far left group Vendetta to combat corruption,injustice,oppression,and despotism in the Philippines. However, with the elections drawing nearer, both De Silva and Hipolito continue to malign the name of Vendetta through Luis "Buwaya" Mangubat and Homer "Alakdan" Adlawan's Kamandag, respectively, each performing acts of terrorism which are blamed on Vendetta. Elsewhere, Cardo's marriage to Alyana is also put to the test as she is pursued by her new boss, Marco Cabrera.

Plot
They later move to Manila with the help of Engelbert "Bert" Moreno alias "Daga" (Rico J. Puno), a former Pulang Araw member and his family. Bert's daughter, Regine (Angeline Quinto) resents Cardo as she recognized the latter as the CIDG officer who killed her brother Banjo (Eric Fructuoso).

In order to make Renato Hipolito pay for his brutalities and his sellout of his being an erstwhile member of Pulang Araw.Romulo,Cardo,and Anton attempt to do an investigation on his past and to unmask the real motive behind the mass bombing incidents in Manila an unscrupulous and corrupt military colonel blackmail and bribed them to commence the bombing.Anton also reveals to Cardo that they did not accept the bribe because Pulang Araw would never tolerate abuse,oppression,and any act of injustice.Now the tables have turned and Romulo confronts Renato for his desertion and treachery and blaming him for being the cause of the deaths of his wife,daughter,and grandson also for the deaths of his comrades.

At this point, Senator de Silva is revealed as a drug dealer who drew funding from Don Emilio in exchange for securing the reversal of the latter's conviction and a stake in de Silva's drug empire. De Silva subsequently joins the hunt for Pulang Araw to catch up to Hipolito in the ratings, both eyeing the top spot to secure the nomination for the Presidency of the Philippines. Bert is later killed by Sen. de Silva's henchmen after the latter refused to reveal Pulang Araw's whereabouts. His family is rescued by Pulang Araw, and finally discovers Senator de Silva's involvement in the assault on Bert's family. Regine and her brother Bruno (Janno Gibbs) moves in with Pulang Araw.

After visiting his dead son's grave, Don Emilio and his henchmen kidnap and torture Cardo in an isolated island called Isla Muerte. Ramil and some of Cardo's inmate friends learn of Cardo's predicament and devise a plan to rescue him. They caused a distraction in the bilibid prison so they can escape. Arriving at the island, they successfully rescued Cardo but two companions, Julian (Julio Diaz) and Gener (Jeric Raval) are killed; Julian was fatally shot by de Silva's men while Gener sacrificed himself to give Cardo, Jimboy, and Ramil time by detonating the bombs they planted in the island. In the ensuing gunfight, Cardo shoots and kills BuCor Director Ladronio (King Gutierrez), one of the persons who helped Don Emilio torture him. 

With the remnants of Cardo's allies from prison and the surviving members of Pulang Araw, Cardo forms the vigilante group and the revolutionary armed movement Vendetta to wipe out corrupt and oppressive elements from the country.

Vendetta started their plan to annihilate Don Emilio's and Sen. de Silva's drug laboratories. They successfully ended the operations of two drug laboratories, leaving no one alive. However, Bruno was then captured by two policemen, Gapuz (Raph Fernandez) and Pantig (Pocholo Barretto), who were corrupt, and Vendetta were not successful in rescuing him, leading to his death. His mother, Dulce (Irma Adlawan), blames Vendetta for his death and she, along with Regine, decided to move to their province for their safety.

Vendetta found a new enemy in Mayor Jethro Garrido (Bernard Palanca), who sells drugs to college students, some of which also selling drugs from him. Mayor Garrido set up a concert motivating students to stop taking drugs. Vendetta found about the planned concert, so Cardo orchestrated a plan for them to get in. They disguised as a band participating in the concert, named Vengaboys. They won in the battle of the bands, and were congratulated by Mayor Garrido. Unbeknownst to him, they are a vigilante group who plan on taking him down. After handing them drugs, Cardo confronted Mayor Garrido, provoking a shootout. Cardo later shot Mayor Garrido to death.

However, after successfully taking down the drug operations, Cardo realized his shortcomings to his wife. He wasn't aware that Alyana was almost kidnapped by Emilio and de Silva's men at her office. When Alyana was about to be kidnapped, her office boss, Marco Cabrera (J. C. Santos), came just in time to save her from the kidnappers. Alyana then broke up with Cardo after she blamed him for not being able to rescue her. However, Cardo is still determined to fix his marriage with Alyana.

General Diana Olegario (Angel Aquino) wanted to talk to Cardo so she and Cardo planned to meet at the bridge. Unbeknownst to her, Major Catindig found out about the plan but was not aware that it was Cardo. In the bridge, when Diana was looking for Cardo, Manolo and his men found her first and cornered her. They successfully shot Diana, but she managed to escape by jumping to the river below. Cardo, who was hiding in his vehicle, then saved Diana and brought her to Vendetta's hideout.
Cardo urges Diana to make her realize what is the real situations and social ills affecting the country itself.
Later on Cardo's group and Diana herself both discuss and talked about how both principles and beliefs which one of them fought for,Romulo tells Diana that he and his movement fought for their rights when they were in the mountains before and laments to her how selfish,greedy,and wicked people in power years have passed do not listen to their pleas.Ramil also confess to her that he was once a criminal in robbing banks but Diana tells her that he was a transgressor of the law,Ramil also discloses to her that by joining the newly armed vigilante group their aim is to purge and eradicate corrupt,crooked,and criminal elements from society.

After General Olegario was well rested, she wanted to go back to the NMIG. As she came back to her house, Diana was ambushed by Cantindig's men. Vendetta followed her beforehand and came to rescue her. When they took her back to their base, she decided to join Vendetta, seeing an opportunity to get justice for her son.

Vendetta finally puts a stop to Don Emilio and Sen. De Silva's operations after they foiled the terror plot that Don Emilio, De Silva, and Buwaya's plan to detonate bombs during Panagbenga Festival, killing De Silva and also "killing" Don Emilio. After the diversion was taken care of, they set their sights next on Director Hipolito and Kamandag. Meanwhile, Alyana gives in to Marco’s advances and starts a relationship with him, much to the chagrin of the latter’s aunt, Menchu Versoza (Matet De Leon).

Cast and characters 

Main cast
 Coco Martin as SPO2 Ricardo "Cardo" Dalisay
 John Arcilla as Director Renato "Buwitre" Hipolito
 Angel Aquino as BGen. Diana T. Olegario
 Jaime Fábregas as P/Dir. Delfin S. Borja
 Jhong Hilario as Homer "Alakdan" Adlawan
 John Prats as SPO3 Jerome Girona, Jr.
 Sid Lucero as Maj. Manolo "Nolo" Cantindig
 Mitch Valdes as Kapitana Gina Magtanggol
 Ronwaldo Martin as Roldan/Gagamba
 Yassi Pressman as Alyana R. Arevalo-Dalisay
 Susan Roces as Flora "Lola Kap" S. Borja-de Leon 
 Eddie Garcia as Don Emilio Syquia

Recurring cast
 Malou Crisologo as Yolanda "Yolly" Capuyao-Santos
 Marvin Yap as Elmo Santos
 John Medina as PS/Insp. Avel "Billy" M. Guzman
 Lester Llansang as PS/Insp. Mark Vargas
 Michael Roy Jornales as PS/Insp. Francisco "Chikoy" Rivera
 Marc Solis as SPO1 Rigor Soriano
 Long Mejia as Francisco "Paco" Alvarado
 PJ Endrinal as Wally Nieves
 Benj Manalo as Felipe "Pinggoy" Tanyag, Jr
 Roy "Shernan" Gaite as Gido
 Pedro "Zaito" Canon, Jr. as Nick 
 Arlene Tolibas as Marikit Flores
 Sancho delas Alas as Gregorio "Greco" Cortez
 Jay Gonzaga as James Cordero
 McNeal "Awra" Briguela as Macario "Makmak" Samonte, Jr.
 James "Paquito" Sagarino as Paquito Alvarado
 Rhian "Dang" Ramos as Amanda “Dang” Ignacio
 Shantel Crislyn Layh "Ligaya" Ngujo as Ligaya Dungalo
 Enzo Pelojero as Dexter Flores
 Joel Torre as Teodoro "Teddy" Arevalo
 Shamaine Centenera-Buencamino as Virginia "Virgie" R. Arevalo

Guest cast

Episodes

References

External links

2017 Philippine television seasons
2018 Philippine television seasons